Taamusi Qumaq,  (January 1, 1914 – July 13, 1993) was an Inuit historian, linguist, writer, politician and elder from Nunavik, Québec, Canada who contributed to the preservation of the Inuit language and traditional culture. Despite lacking any formal schooling, Qumaq published two seminal works on the Inuit culture: a 30,000-word comprehensive Inuktitut dictionary and an encyclopedia on Inuit traditional customs and knowledge. He was fluent in Inuktitut only.

He understood Canadian and Quebec institutions and worked for their integration into Inuit lifestyle for the betterment of his community. He was a founding member of the first non-governmental coop in the Canadian Arctic, in 1956 in Puvirnituq. After contributing to the establishment of Rankin Inlet in the Northwest Territories, he returned to Puvirnituq in 1960 and founded its first village council and acted as its chair from 1962 to 1968.

From 1972 to 1977, he was a vocal opponent of the James Bay and Northern Quebec Agreement and the leader of Inuit Tungavingat Nunamini, a movement opposing the signature of the land claims settlement by the Northern Quebec Inuit Association. In 1983 he took part to the Quebec commissions on Aboriginal rights and on Nouveau-Québec’s self-government.

In 2010, Presses de l'Université du Québec published his autobiography translated in French, Je veux que les Inuit soient libres de nouveau (I want Inuit to be free again). The autobiography was later re-released as a bilingual version in French and Inuktitut in 2020.

Name
The name Qumaq was originally an inuit mononym. In 1917, he was baptised and given the Christian name Taamusi (Thomas). Qumaq eventually became registered as his family name.

Early life
Qumaq was born on Niqsiturlik island near Inukjuak sometime in January 1914 to his nomadic parents. The family travelled by dog sled between Kuujjuarapik and Puvirnituq and hunted game such as walrus, seal, and fish. Qumaq's family also collected fox pelts to trade for European supplies at trading posts near Inukjuak and Puvirnituq. In 1920, his mother participated in the filming of Nanook of the North.

His father died in a boating accident when Qumaq was 13 years old. Without this teaching figure, Qumaq had to rely on other Inuit families to learn how to hunt and construct an igloo. He settled in 1931 in Puvirnituq with his siblings and mother.

Adult life
In 1937, he married his wife, Maina Milurtuq. Over the next few years, there were few animals and starvation abounded in his community, which was exacerbated by the concomitant closing of trading posts, the drop in value of fox pelts and the decrease in availability of commodities due to World War II. However, Qumaq was able to sustain his family and elders with the help of other hunters. Mail was flown in from Moose Factory to Inukjuak, and Qumaq was responsible from ferrying all the mail to Puvirnituq, Akulivik, Ivujivik, and Salluit on a single dog sled. He would bring the mail to Puvirnituq, after which it was picked up by another courier to be transported farther north.

Following the relocation of Inuit near Akulivik and Puvirnituq to Puvirnituq proper in 1952, and the establishment of social welfare, Qumaq began to work at the new Hudson Bay Company store for $150 per month. He travelled with members of the Hudson Bay Company in 1958 to establish a general goods store to the north of Churchill, Manitoba, but instead landed in Rankin Inlet due to bad weather, where he lived for two years.

1958 was also the beginning of prefab wooden houses in Puvirnituq. Previously, Inuit lived in igloos during the winter and tents during the summer. Upon his return to Puvirnituq, Qumaq constructed his house in 1960 and never built another igloo.

Political life
In 1961, an administrator of the department of Indian Affairs and Northern Development Canada mandated that a village council be elected. Nobody campaigned for the position and no names were pre-written on the ballot. To his own surprise, Qumaq was elected as head of the village council.

He lobbied against the federal residential school that was established in 1958, eventually replacing it in 1969 by public vote 89 to 9 with a school run by the Quebec government where Inuktitut and Inuit culture would be taught, in addition to the primary topics in English or French.

He also supported the new Inuit cooperative general store founded in 1963, which would eventually become a federation of cooperatives across Nunavik in 1966. The cooperatives made money by selling soapstone carvings in the south and by selling commodities to the local Inuit.

Qumaq and representatives from all the other villages in Nunavik met with René Lévesque in Fort Chimo in 1964, where they discussed Inuit autonomy and place in Quebec society.

He oversaw the construction of houses to ensure everyone had a permanent residence to stay. In his life he witnessed the gradual appearance of motor boats, skidoos, and alcohol in the community.

References

External Links 
Order of Canada
Biography of Taamusi Qumaq on www.inuit.uqam.ca
Secrétariat de l'Ordre national du Québec
Avataq Cultural Institute

Qumaq, Taamusi (2020). Je veux que les Inuit soient libres de nouveau. Autobiographie (1914-1993). ᐃᓄᓐᓂᒃ ᐃᓱᒣᓐᓇᕿᖁᔨᒋᐊᓪᓚᐳᖓ ᐃᓅᓯᕐᒥᓂᒃ ᐊᓪᓚᑐᕕᓂᖅ (1914-ᒥᑦ 1993-ᒧᑦ). Presses de l'Université du Québec. .

1914 births
1993 deaths
Inuit from Quebec
Canadian non-fiction writers
Knights of the National Order of Quebec
Members of the Order of Canada